A bowl is a common vessel used to serve food.

Bowl(s) or The Bowl may also refer to:

 Bowl (smoking), in cannabis culture
 a dish served in a bowl, such as a Buddha bowl
 Bowl, part of a letter in typeface anatomy
 Bowl game, in American football
 Bowls, an outdoor bowling sport in the UK
 Bowls (photograph), a 1916 photograph by Paul Strand
 The Bowl (Cherokee chief) (died 1839), a leader of the Chickamauga Cherokee 
 The Bowl (Douglas), a stadium in Douglas, Isle of Man, UK
 "The Bowl", a short story by F. Scott Fitzgerald, included in The Short Stories of F. Scott Fitzgerald
 Beatrice Wind Farm, or Beatrice Offshore Windfarm Ltd., on the northeast coast of Scotland

See also
 List of college bowl games
 Bol (disambiguation)
 Bole (disambiguation)
 Boule (disambiguation)
 Bowler (disambiguation)
 Bowles (disambiguation)
 Bowling (disambiguation)